Lukov is a municipality and village in Teplice District in the Ústí nad Labem Region of the Czech Republic. It has about 100 inhabitants.

Administrative parts
The village of Štěpánov is an administrative part of Lukov.

References

Villages in Teplice District